View from the Vault, Volume One, sometimes known simply as View from the Vault, is the first release in a series of DVDs and companion soundtracks by the Grateful Dead known as "View from the Vault". The audio is taken from the soundboard and the video from the video screens at the concerts. The first volume was recorded and filmed at Three Rivers Stadium in Pittsburgh on July 8, 1990 with bonus material recorded two days earlier at Cardinal Stadium, Louisville. The set was certified Gold by the RIAA on February 2, 2001.  The soundtrack was released as a 3-CD set.

Track listing

Disc one
"Touch of Grey" > (Robert Hunter, Jerry Garcia) – 6:36
"Greatest Story Ever Told" (Hunter, Mickey Hart, Bob Weir) – 4:44
"Jack-a-Roe" (trad., arr. Grateful Dead) – 5:09
"New Minglewood Blues" (trad., arr. Weir) – 7:18
"Row Jimmy" (Hunter, Garcia) – 11:50
"Mama Tried" > (Merle Haggard) – 2:32
"Mexicali Blues" (John Barlow, Weir) – 5:31
"Just Like Tom Thumb's Blues" (Bob Dylan) – 6:13
"Let It Grow" (Barlow, Weir) – 12:15

Disc two
"Samson and Delilah" > (trad., arr. Weir) – 7:05
"Eyes of the World" > (Hunter, Garcia) – 15:14
"Estimated Prophet" > (Barlow, Weir) – 11:40
"Terrapin Station" > (Hunter, Garcia) – 14:56
"Jam" > (Grateful Dead) – 4:46
"Drums" > (Hart, Bill Kreutzmann) – 7:38
"Space" > (Garcia, Phil Lesh, Weir) – 9:04

Disc three
"I Need a Miracle" > (Barlow, Weir) – 5:28
"Wang Dang Doodle" > (Willie Dixon) – 5:20
"Black Peter" > (Hunter, Garcia) – 9:42
"Throwing Stones" > (Barlow, Weir) – 9:22
"Turn On Your Lovelight" (Deadric Malone, Joseph Scott) – 8:39
"Knockin' On Heaven's Door" (Dylan) – 7:07
Bonus tracks from July 6, 1990:
"Standing on the Moon" > (Hunter, Garcia) – 9:44
"He's Gone" > (Hunter, Garcia) – 9:41
"KY Jam" (Grateful Dead) – 13:42

Personnel
Jerry Garcia – lead guitar, vocals
Bob Weir – rhythm guitar, vocals
Phil Lesh – bass guitar, vocals
Brent Mydland – Hammond organ, keyboards, vocals
Mickey Hart – drums, percussion
Bill Kreutzmann – drums, percussion
Len Dell'Amico - co-producer, director
Dan Healy – recording
Dick Latvala – tape archivist
David Lemieux – tape archivist
Jeffrey Norman – mastering
Lindsay Planer – booklet notes
Bob Minkin,  – graphic design, photography

See also
 View from the Vault, Volume Two
 View from the Vault, Volume Three
 View from the Vault, Volume Four
 Backstage Pass

References 

01
2000 live albums
2000 video albums
Live video albums